Udullu may refer to the following places in Azerbaijan:
 Udullu, Shabran, a village in the Davachi Rayon
 Udullu, Hajigabul (disambiguation)
Birinci Udullu, Azerbaijan
İkinci Udullu, Azerbaijan